Shi Liang (born 11 May 1989) is a Chinese football player who currently plays for Meizhou Kejia in the Chinese Super League.

Club career
Shi started his professional career with China League Two side Guangdong Sunray Cave in the 2007 league season. He scored one goal in four appearances as Guangdong Sunray Cave won promotion to the second tier at the end of the 2008 season. The following season he would help establish the club in the division and go on to be their top goalscorer with eight goals.

In February 2013, Shi moved to Chinese Super League side Guizhou Renhe on a free transfer. He would go on to make his debut for the club on 8 March 2013 in a league game against Qingdao Jonoon F.C. in a 2-1 defeat. Throughout the season he would struggle to establish himself within the team and was loaned out to third-tier club Meizhou Kejia for the remainder of the season and the whole of the 2014 league campaign. When Shi returned he was given more playing time, however at the end of the 2015 Chinese Super League campaign he was part of the team that was relegated at the end of the season. Shi would remain with Guizhou Renhe as they would move to Beijing and rename themselves Beijing Renhe on the 16 January 2016. By the 2017 league season Shi was converted to a defensive midfielder and helped guide the club to promotion back into the top tier at the end of the season.

On 13 February 2020, Shi would return to Meizhou, to join second tier club Meizhou Hakka. He would go on to make his debut in a league game on 13 September 2020 against Liaoning Shenyang Urban that ended in a 2-0 victory. After the game he would go on to establish himself as a vital member of the team that gained promotion to the top tier after coming second within the division at the end of the 2021 China League One campaign.

Career statistics
Statistics accurate as of match played 31 December 2022.

References

External links
 

1989 births
Living people
Chinese footballers
People from Xingning
Guangdong Sunray Cave players
Beijing Renhe F.C. players
Meizhou Hakka F.C. players
Chinese Super League players
China League One players
China League Two players
Hakka sportspeople
Footballers from Meizhou
Association football forwards